The weak central coherence theory (WCC), also called the central coherence theory (CC), suggests that a specific perceptual-cognitive style, loosely described as a limited ability to understand context or to "see the big picture", underlies the central disturbance in autism and related autism spectrum disorders.  Autism is a neurodevelopmental disorder characterized by impaired social interaction and communication, as well as repetitive behaviours and restricted interests.

The weak central coherence theory attempts to explain how some people diagnosed with autism can show remarkable ability in subjects like mathematics and engineering, yet have trouble with language skills and tend to live in an isolated social world.  The theory is among the more prominent conceptual models that try to explain the abnormalities of autistic individuals on tasks involving local and global cognitive processes.

Uta Frith, of University College London, first advanced the weak central coherence theory in the late 1980s. Frith surmised that autistic people typically think about things in the smallest possible parts. Her hypothesis is that autistic children actually perceive details better than neurotypical people, but "cannot see the wood for the trees."

Support and criticism
In the last two decades, this theory has been a topic in many studies in which the central coherence skills of individuals with autism are compared to those of control samples. 
 Results in which these skills are measured with visuospatial tasks confirm the theory to a large extent. Autistic individuals performed tasks where a design or a figure had to be divided into their constituent parts faster than control individuals. For example, autistic individuals perceived the constituent blocks in an unsegmented condition of a Block Design Task more easily (Happé, 1999; Ehlers et al., 1997; Shah & Frith, 1993). In addition, they performed Embedded Figures Tasks in which hidden shapes in drawings have to be found as quickly as possible, better than control individuals (Happé, 1994b; Jolliffe & Baron-Cohen, 1997; Shah & Frith, 1983).
 Results in which central coherence skills are measured with perceptual or verbal-semantic tasks revealed that autistic individuals have a tendency for fragmented perception (Jarrold & Russell, 1997; Happé, 1996), and that they benefit less from the context of meaning in sentences, narratives and memory tests (Happé, 1994b; Jolliffe & Baron-Cohen, 1999).
 
However, there is currently no consensus about the validity of the weak central coherence theory. There are researchers who find results that refute the WCC theory.

In 1994 Sally Ozonoff, David L. Strayer, William M. McMahon and Francis Filloux compared information processing skills in high functioning autistics and controls:
"The performance of high-functioning autistic children was compared with that of two matched control groups, one with Tourette Syndrome and the other developmentally normal. Autistic subjects performed as well as controls on tasks requiring global-local processing and inhibition of neutral responses."
Laurent Mottron, Jacob A. Burack, Johannes E. A. Stauder and Philippe Robaey (1999) conclude that: 
"Contrary to expectations based on the central coherence and hierarchisation deficit theories, [our]  findings indicate intact holistic processing among persons with autism."
In 2003 they did another study which confirmed their earlier findings and in which they conclude:
"Conclusions: [Our] findings are consistent with other reports of superior performance in detecting embedded figures (Jolliffe & Baron-Cohen, 1997; Shah & Frith, 1983), but typical performance in global and configural processing (Mottron, Burack et al., 1999; Ozonoff et al., 1994) among persons with high-functioning autism. Thus, the notions of local bias and global impairment that are part of WCC may need to be reexamined."
Also in 2003 Beatriz López, Susan R. Leekam conclude their study:
"Conclusions: [Our] findings demonstrate that children with autism do not have a general difficulty in connecting context information and item information as predicted by weak central coherence theory. Instead the results suggest that there is specific difficulty with complex verbal stimuli and in particular with using sentence context to disambiguate meaning."
Natasja van Lang gives the following explanation for these contradictory results: 
"Results in which central coherence skills are measured with perceptual or verbal-semantic tasks revealed that autistic individuals have a tendency for fragmented perception (Jarrold & Russell, 1997; Happé, 1996), and that they benefit less from the context of meaning in sentences, narratives and memory tests (Happé, 1994b; Jolliffe & Baron-Cohen, 1999). However, some studies failed to replicate these findings (Brian & Bryson, 1996; Ozonoff et al., 1991; Ropar & Mitchell, 1999). This inconsistency may be explained on the basis of how weak central coherence was measured in terms of an inability to process globally versus the preference for processing locally. Recent studies suggest that people with autism are able to process globally when they are instructed to do so, however they process information locally when no such instructions are offered (Mottron et al., 1999; Plaisted et al., 1999; Rinehart et al., 2000)."
Autistic people have also questioned the theory of WCC. One of the criticisms is that the 'context' deemed universal by the researchers might not at all be so universal from a rational point of view.
In her blog Alyric devotes an article to Central Coherence:
"There are differences in the kinds of 'big picture' here obviously. One refers to systems and the others, of the kind that Frith and Happe automatically assumed to be universal, have an essential social element."
Naja Melan claims that neurotypical people are often biased to overemphasize one context and neglecting all other contexts. This he states is an expression of WCC, as compared to autists who have the possibility of consciously focusing on multiple contexts if deemed appropriate by them or requested.

See also
 Asperger syndrome
 Sensory processing disorder
 Theory of mind

References

External links
 in-cities.com - 'An interview with:  Professor Uta Frith' (March, 2005)
 UCDavis.edu - 'Uta Frith, Ph.D.  M.I.N.D. Institute Distinguished Lecturer Series' (February 8, 2006)
 Hypnosisschool.org - Summary of Global and Local processes

Autism
1980s neologisms